Calcium monohydride is a molecule composed of calcium and hydrogen with formula CaH.  It can be found in stars as a gas formed when calcium atoms are present with hydrogen atoms.

Discovery
Calcium monohydride was first discovered when its spectrum was observed in Alpha Herculis and ο Ceti by Alfred Fowler in 1907. It was observed in sunspots the following year by C. M. Olmsted. Next, it was made in a laboratory in 1909 by A. Eagle, and with early research by Hulthèn, and Watson and Weber in 1935.  It was further observed in M dwarfs by Y. Öhman in 1934. Öhman proposed its use as a proxy for stellar luminosity, similar to magnesium monohydride (MgH), in being more apparent in the spectra of compact, cool, high surface gravity stars such as M dwarfs than in cool, low surface gravity stars such as M giants of non-negligible, or even comparable, metallicity.

Calcium monohydride is the first molecular gas that was cooled by a cold buffer gas and then trapped by a magnetic field.  This extends the study of trapped cold atoms such as rubidium to molecules.

Formation
Calcium monohydride can be formed by exposing metallic calcium to an electric discharge in a hydrogen atmosphere above 750 °C.  Below this temperature the hydrogen is absorbed to form calcium hydride.

Calcium monohydride can be formed by laser ablation of calcium dihydride in a helium atmosphere.

Gaseous calcium reacts with formaldehyde at temperatures around 1200 K to make CaH as well as some CaOH and CaO.  This reaction glows orange-red.

Properties
The dipole moment of the CaH molecule is 2.94 debye. Spectrographic constants have been measured as bond length Re=2.0025 Å dissociation energy De=1.837 eV and harmonic vibrational frequency ωe=1298.34 cm−1. Ionisation potential is 5.8 eV. Electron affinity is 0.9 eV.

The ground state is X2Σ+.

The electronic states are:
6σ27σ X2Σ+
6σ23π A2Π
6σ28σ B2Σ+
6σ24π E2Π
6σ7σ2 D2Σ+

Spectrum
B2Σ, with ν'=0 ← X2Σ with ν"=0 634 nm (or is it 690 nm?) CaH fluoresces with 634 nm light giving 690 nm emissions.

B2Σ+ ← X2Σ+ 585.8 nm to 590.2 nm.

A+2Π ← X2Σ+ 686.2 to 697.8 nm

R12 branch

R2 branch

C2Σ+ →X2Σ+ transition is in near ultraviolet.

Microwave spectrum
The energy required to spin the CaH molecule from its lowest level to the first quantum level corresponds to a microwave frequency, so there is an absorption around 253 GHz.  However, the spin of the molecule is also affected by the spin of an unpaired electron on the calcium, and the spin of the proton in the hydrogen.  The electron spin leads to splitting of the line by about 1911.7 MHz, and the spin relative to the proton spin results in hyperfine splitting of the line by about 157.3 MHz.

Reactions
CaH reacts with Lithium as a cold gas releasing 0.9eV of energy and forming LiH molecules and calcium atoms.

Extra reading

References

Metal hydrides
Calcium compounds